Bruce's Snowball Market No. 1 Addition is a historic building located in Perry, Iowa, United States.  The two-story brick structure with Art Deco styling was built in 1930.  It was an addition to a building, non-extant, that was built in 1922 on the edge of the downtown area.  It is an example of a grocery store suited to people who own automobiles and could drive to acquire goods and services.  The building follows an irregular plan that conforms to the irregularly shaped site.  It is also the terminus of a significant urban view in town.  The structure features brickwork and cast concrete trim in chevron patterns there were popular in Art Deco decor.  It was added to the National Register of Historic Places in 2000.

References

Commercial buildings completed in 1930
Perry, Iowa
Art Deco architecture in Iowa
Commercial buildings on the National Register of Historic Places in Iowa
Buildings and structures in Dallas County, Iowa
National Register of Historic Places in Dallas County, Iowa
1930 establishments in Iowa